Trade mission is an international trip by government officials and businesspeople that is organized by agencies of national or provincial governments for purpose of exploring international business opportunities. Business people who attend trade missions are typically introduced both to important business contacts and to well-placed government officials. A trade mission is a way in which countries or organizations can seek out potential buyers and sellers. Trade missions will usually occur after one party has undergone significant market research. In short, trade mission is a trip that is designed to transport business executives into a foreign business environment to achieve International business relationship.

Considerations 
Several factors are needed to be considered whenever a business executive is trying to join a trade mission.
Clearly stating the goal of trade mission before the departure is important.
Choosing the target industry and the participants is a crucial aspect. 
Executives have to analyze the costs and possible future benefits of trade mission.
Careful evaluation of the agenda is required.
Target audience should be decided upon actual trade mission.

Controversy regarding Trade Mission 
Trade missions are supposed to be about developing trade opportunities. However, when government agency is involved, there is controversy regarding international politics being involved. Trade mission might not be conducted targeting particular industry or actual companies which won't be about developing international trade but international politics.

Canada 
In Canada, trade missions which include both the federal and provincial governments working together (perhaps also with cities and private businesses) are called "Team Canada Missions"

UK 
UK sends British High commissions to India for trade missions. UK's continuous efforts with India in having trade missions in both countries have brought huge economic benefits.

See also 
 Globalization
 International trade
 International business
 International politics

References

International trade
Diplomatic conferences
Types of diplomacy